Najāshi or al-Najāshī may refer to:

Najashi, also known as Armah or Aṣḥamah, ruler of the Kingdom of Aksum from 614 to 631
Ahmad ibn Ali al-Najashi (–1058), Twelver Shi'ite scholar known for his work on the biographical evaluation of hadith transmitters, the